The 1973 Flores cyclone was the deadliest known tropical cyclone in the Southern Hemisphere, having killed 1,653 people in Indonesia in April 1973. The cyclone formed in the Banda Sea on 26 April as a tropical low. It intensified as it moved in a west-southwest direction, before shifting to the south. On 29 April, the cyclone struck the north coast of the island of Flores, dissipating the next day. The cyclone killed 1,500 fishermen on Palu'e island. The cyclone dropped heavy rainfall across Flores, causing deadly flash flooding that damaged buildings and roads.

Meteorological history

On 26 April, a tropical low formed in the Banda Sea in the waters of eastern Indonesia. According to Australia's Bureau of Meteorology BoM, the low moved to the west-southwest and intensified, although this was based on a later analysis. As the storm was outside of the agency's jurisdiction, the BoM did not issue warnings on the system at the time. The low attained gale-force winds late on 27 April as it moved into the Flores Sea. Late the next day, the storm turned southwestward.

The BoM estimated that the storm reached peak intensity early on 29 April, assessing it as a Category 3 on the Australian tropical cyclone intensity scale, with maximum sustained winds of 150 km/h (90 mph). While near peak intensity, the small tropical cyclone had eye embedded within a central dense overcast, 295 km (185 mi) in diameter. The cyclone made landfall on the northern coast of the Indonesian island of Flores. After crossing the island, the cyclone dissipated on 30 April near Flores' southern coast.

Impact
In the Flores Sea, the cyclone capsized a 500-ton freighter O Arbiru, based out of Portuguese Timor, which was delivering a rice shipment from Bangkok. Of the crew of 24 people, only one person survived. On Palu'e island alone, the cyclone killed 1,500 fishermen.

News of the disaster in Flores took a month to reach authorities in the capital, Jakarta, due to lack of communications and the remoteness of the island. Across the region, the cyclone killed 1,653 people, making it the deadliest tropical cyclone recorded in the Southern Hemisphere. The storm lashed the coast with a storm surge, which newspapers described as a "tidal wave". In Ngada Regency, high waves drowned 24 people. Another 10 people were killed in Manggarai Regency. For three days, the storm dropped heavy rainfall across Flores, which produced deadly flash flooding that washed away rice fields, livestock, and entire homes. The cyclone wrecked schools, homes, dams, and bridges. The storm also wrecked government buildings, with heavy damage reported in the regional capital of Ende.

After the floods, the Indonesian government constructed the Sutami Weir, which was finished in 1975. The weir controlled the water flow on the island and helped irrigate  of rice paddy fields.

See also

 1970 Bhola cyclone – The deadliest cyclone recorded worldwide
 Cyclone Inigo – Caused deadly floods in Indonesia before developing into a tropical cyclone
 Cyclone Idai – The next-deadliest tropical cyclone recorded in the Southern Hemisphere
 Cyclone Seroja – Another deadly tropical cyclone that struck similar areas in 2021

References

External links
More information about the shipwreck

1972–73 Southern Hemisphere tropical cyclone season
1973 in Indonesia
1973 natural disasters
Tropical cyclones in Indonesia
Flores Island (Indonesia)